Leslie Shewan (12 June 1892 – 25 September 1977) was an Australian cricketer. He played in one first-class match for Queensland in 1924/25.

See also
 List of Queensland first-class cricketers

References

External links
 

1892 births
1977 deaths
Australian cricketers
Queensland cricketers